Zhang Yafei (born 15 September 1970) is a Chinese sport shooter who competed in the 2000 Summer Olympics.

References

1970 births
Living people
Chinese male sport shooters
Trap and double trap shooters
Olympic shooters of China
Shooters at the 2000 Summer Olympics
Shooters at the 1998 Asian Games
Shooters at the 2002 Asian Games
Shooters at the 2006 Asian Games
Shooters at the 2010 Asian Games
Shooters at the 2014 Asian Games
Asian Games medalists in shooting
World record holders in shooting
Asian Games gold medalists for China
Asian Games silver medalists for China
Asian Games bronze medalists for China
Medalists at the 1998 Asian Games
Medalists at the 2002 Asian Games
Medalists at the 2006 Asian Games
Medalists at the 2010 Asian Games
Medalists at the 2014 Asian Games
Sportspeople from Handan
Sport shooters from Hebei
21st-century Chinese people